

Events 
 
 January–March 
 January 4 – First English Civil War: Charles I attempts to arrest six leading members of the Long Parliament, but they escape.
 February 5 – The Bishops Exclusion Act is passed in England to prevent any member of the clergy from holding political office.
 February 15 – Endymion Porter is voted to be a "dangerous counsellor" by the English parliament. 
 February 17 – The Treaty of Axim is signed between the Dutch West India Company and the chiefs of the Nzema people in what is now the African nation of Ghana.
 February 18 – A group of Protestant English settlers in Ireland surrender to Irish authorities at Castlebar in County Mayo in hopes of having their lives spared, and are killed one week later on orders of Edmond Bourke.
 February 20 – The Treaty of The Hague, between the Dutch Republic and the Kingdom of Portugal, is ratified by the Republic's States-General. 
 February 22 – The Italian opera Il palazzo incantato (The Enchanted Palace), by Luigi Rossi with libretto by Giulion Rospigliosi, is given its first performance.
 March 1 – Georgeana, Massachusetts (now known as York, Maine) becomes the first incorporated city in America.
 March 19 – The citizens of Galway seize an English naval ship, close the town gates, and declare support for Confederate Ireland.

 April–June 
 April  - Hannibal Sehested was appointed Governor-General of Norway.
 April 8 – George Spencer is executed by the New Haven Colony, for alleged bestiality.
 May 1 – Honours granted by Charles I, from this date onward, are retrospectively annulled by Parliament.
 May 17 – Ville-Marie (later Montreal) is founded as a permanent settlement.
 May 18 – In Ireland, the five week Siege of Limerick, under control by English Protestants, is started by the Irish Confederation.
 June 1 – The "Nineteen Propositions" are sent by the English House of Lords and House of Commons to King Charles I, asking the King to consent to parliamentary approval for the members of his privy council, his chief officers, and new seats created for the House of Lords, as well as regulating the education and choice of marital partners of the King's children, and barring Roman Catholics from the Lords. 
 June 10 – Juan de Palafox y Mendoza, Archbishop of Mexico, fires the Viceroy of New Spain, Diego López Pacheco, allegedly on orders of King Philip IV, and takes office as the new Viceroy. Palafox is only in office for five months before being recalled to Spain.
 June 16 – The Battle of Glenmaquin takes place in Ireland's County Donegal, with English Royalists defeating the Irish Confederation's soldiers.
 June 18 – Troops led by Garret Barry of the Irish Confederation, are successful in the Siege of Limerick after five weeks.
 June 29 – The three-day Battle of Barcelona begins at sea as a French Navy fleet of 75 ships, commanded by Admiral Jean Armand de Maillé-Brézé clashes off the coast of Spain with a Spanish fleet of 52 ships.

 July–September 
 July 2 – Hundreds of sailors are killed when the French warship Galion de Guise and the Spanish galley Magdalena become entangled during the Battle of Barcelona. A French fireship attempts to burn the Magdalena and accidentally sets fire to the Galion de Guise, killing 500 of the 540 crew. 
 July 3 – The French Navy wins the Battle of Barcelona.
 July 4 – The Committee of Safety is created by the English Parliament as a challenge to the authority of King Charles I. Five members of the House of Lords (Robert Devereux, 3rd Earl of Essex, Henry Rich, 1st Earl of Holland, Algernon Percy, 10th Earl of Northumberland, Philip Herbert, 4th Earl of Pembroke, and the William Fiennes, 1st Viscount Saye and Sele and ten members of the House of Commons Nathaniel Fiennes, John Glynn, John Hampden, Denzil Holles, Henry Marten, John Merrick, William Pierrepoint, John Pym, Philip Stapleton, and William Waller are appointed to the Committee. 
 July 10 – First English Civil War: Charles I besieges Hull, in an attempt to gain control of its arsenal. The siege lasts until July 27, with Charles's Royalist Army failing to take the city from the Parliamentarians commanded by Governor John Hotham and General John Meldrum.
 July 12 – The English Parliament votes to raise its own Army, under the command of the Earl of Essex.
August 3 – A Dutch Navy fleet of 14 warships, led by Hendric Harouse, begins a campaign to drive Spaniards from the island of Formosa (now Taiwan) off of the coast of mainland China. After disembarking at Tamsui, the Dutch begin a siege of Fort Domingo, which falls on Saint Bartolomeo Day (August 24). 
 August 4 – Lord Forbes relieves Forthill, and besieges Galway.
 August 22 – King Charles I raises the royal battle standard over Nottingham Castle, so declaring war on his own Parliament.
 September 2 – Parliament orders the theatres of London closed, effectively ending the era of English Renaissance theatre.
 September 6 – England's Long Parliament suppresses all stage plays in theatres.
 September 7 – Lord Forbes raises his unsuccessful siege of Galway.
 September 8 – Thomas Granger is executed by hanging at Plymouth, Massachusetts, for confessing to numerous acts of bestiality.

 October–December 
 October 8 –  1642 Yellow River flood: Some 300,000 people die in the intentional breaking of the dams and dykes of the Yellow River, done either by the Ming dynasty defenders of Kaifeng to break the siege by the large Manchu dynasty rebel force of Li Zicheng. 
 October 23 – First English Civil War – Battle of Edgehill: Royalists and Parliamentarians battle to a draw.
 November 13 – First English Civil War – Battle of Turnham Green: The Royalist forces withdraw in face of the Parliamentarian army, and fail to take London.
 November 15 – Sir Edward Ford, High Sheriff of Sussex, captures Chichester from the Parliamentarians without resistance. The Parliamentarians send Sir William Waller to recapture Chichester. 
 November 24 – Abel Tasman and his crew become the first Europeans to discover "Van Diemen's Land", now the Australian island  and state of Tasmania, and the island is claimed for the Netherlands on December 3 at what is now Prince of Wales Bay. 
November 27 – Hong Taiji (known in the West as Abatai) begins a 60-day march of Manchu warriors, southwardly from the Great Wall through Ming Chinese provinces of Zhili and Shandong, before returning northward on January 27.  Two years later Beijing falls to rebels, the Chongzhen Emperor commits suicide, and the Shunzhi Emperor becomes the first Qing Emperor to rule over China proper.
 December 13 – Abel Tasman and his crew become the first recorded Europeans to sight New Zealand, arriving at its South Island. In a battle between the Europeans and the Island's Maori inhabitants, four crew members are killed.
 December 21 – After routing Edward Ford's royalist troops at the Battle of Muster Green, William Waller follows Ford's retreating force to Chichester as the Parliamentarians besiege the city, which falls on December 29 after eight days. The inhabitants of Chichester agree to pay the Parliamentarians an additional month's pay to prevent the town from being plundered. 

 Date unknown 
 The village of Bro (Broo), Sweden is granted city rights for the second time, and takes the name Kristinehamn (literally "Christina's port") after the then Swedish monarch, Queen Christina.
 Rembrandt finishes his painting, The Night Watch.
 Isaac Aboab da Fonseca is appointed rabbi in Pernambuco, Brazil, thus becoming the first rabbi of the Americas.

Births

January–March 
 January 2
 Johannes van Haensbergen, Dutch Golden Age painter (d. 1705)
 Mehmed IV, Sultan of the Ottoman Empire (1648-1687) (d. 1693)
 January 3 – Diego Morcillo Rubio de Auñón, Spanish-born Peruvian Catholic bishop (d. 1730)
 January 4 – Philippe Pierson, Belgian Jesuit missionary (d. 1688)
 January 5 – Johann Philipp Jeningen, German Catholic priest from Eichstätt, Bavaria (d. 1704)
 January 6
 Julien Garnier, French Jesuit missionary to Canada (d. 1730)
 Gisbert Steenwick, Dutch musician (d. 1679)
 January 11
 Johann Friedrich Alberti, German composer and organist (d. 1710)
 Mary Carleton, Englishwoman who used false identities (d. 1673)
 January 26 – Evert Collier, Dutch Golden Age painter (d. 1708)
 February 3 – Philip Aranda, Spanish Jesuit theologian (d. 1695)
 February 18 – Marie Champmeslé, French actress (d. 1698)
 March 2 – Claudio Coello, Spanish Baroque painter (d. 1693)
 March 4 – Stanisław Herakliusz Lubomirski, Polish noble (d. 1702)
 March 23 – Hester Davenport, English stage actress (d. 1717)
 March 25 – Anna Talbot, Countess of Shrewsbury, English countess (d. 1702)
 March 28 – Henry Wolrad, Count of Waldeck-Eisenberg (1645–1664) (d. 1664)
 March 29 – Emich Christian of Leiningen-Dagsburg, Lord of Broich, Oberstein and Bürgel (d. 1702)
 March 31 – Ephraim Curtis, American colonial military officer (d. 1684)

April–June 
 April 15 – Suleiman II, Ottoman Sultan (d. 1691)
 April 21 – Simon de la Loubère, French diplomat (d. 1729)
 April 27 – Francisque Millet, Flemish-French painter (d. 1679)
 April 30 – Christian Weise, German writer, dramatist, poet, pedagogue and librarian (d. 1708)
 May 5 – James Tyrrell, English barrister and writer (d. 1718)
 June 8 – Frescheville Holles, English Member of Parliament (d. 1672)
 June 12 – Alexander Seton, 3rd Earl of Dunfermline, earl in the Peerage of Scotland (d. 1677)
 June 13 – Queen Myeongseong, Korean royal consort (d. 1684)
 June 18 – Paul Tallement the Younger, French writer (d. 1712)
 June 20 – George Hickes, English minister and scholar (d. 1715)
 June 28 – Jacob de Graeff, member of the De Graeff-family from the Dutch Golden Age (d. 1690)

July–September 
 July 3 – Joseph-François Hertel de la Fresnière, military officer of New France (d. 1722)
 July 7 – Gregorio II Boncompagni, Italian nobleman, 5th Duke of Sora (d. 1707)
 July 25 – Louis I, Prince of Monaco, Monegasque prince (d. 1701)
 August 3 – Robert Austen, English politician (d. 1696)
 August 12 – Andrea Scacciati, Italian painter (d. 1710)
 August 14 – Cosimo III de' Medici, Grand Duke of Tuscany (d. 1723)
 September 1 – Angelo Paoli, Italian beatified (d. 1720)
 September 5 – Maria of Orange-Nassau, Dutch princess (d. 1688)
 September 6 – Georg Christoph Bach, German composer (d. 1697)
 September 23 – Giovanni Maria Bononcini, Italian violinist and composer (d. 1678)

October–December 
 October 12 – Abraham van Calraet, Dutch painter (d. 1722)
 November 4 – Zheng Jing, Chinese pirate (d. 1681)
 November 5 – Nils Gyldenstolpe, Swedish count, official and diplomat (d. 1709)
 November 9 – Sir John Lowther, 2nd Baronet, of Whitehaven, English politician (d. 1706)
 November 11 – André Charles Boulle, French cabinet-maker (d. 1732)
 November 16 – Cornelis Evertsen the Youngest, Dutch admiral (d. 1706)
 November 24 – Anne Hilarion de Tourville, French naval commander under King Louis XIV (d. 1701)
 November 30 – Andrea Pozzo, Jesuit Brother, architect and painter (d. 1709)
 December 6
 Johann Christoph Bach, German composer and organist (d. 1703)
 Gerard Callenburgh, Dutch admiral (d. 1722)
 December 8 – Nicolas Roland, French priest and founder (d. 1678)
 December 13 – Friedrich Seyler, Swiss theologian (d. 1708)
 December 17
 Francisco Castillo Fajardo, Marquis of Villadarias, Spanish general (d. 1716)
 Francis de Geronimo, Italian priest (d. 1716)
 December 23 – John Holt, English politician (d. 1710)
 December 25 – Sir Isaac Newton, English scientist (d. 1727)
 December 30
 Vincenzo da Filicaja, Italian poet (d. 1707)
 François Roger de Gaignières, French genealogist, antiquary, collector (d. 1715)

Date unknown 
 Abdul-Qādir Bīdel, Persian Sufi poet (d. 1720)
 Bonaventure Giffard, English Catholic priest (d. 1734)
 Albert Janse Ryckman, Mayor of Albany, prominent brewermaster (d. 1737)
 Marie Anne de La Trémoille, princesse des Ursins, politically active Spanish court official (d. 1722)

Deaths 

 January 8 – Galileo Galilei, Italian astronomer and physicist (b. 1564)
 January 12 – Johann Ernst, Count of Hanau-Münzenberg (1641–1642) (b. 1613)
 January 13 – Sophia Hedwig of Brunswick-Lüneburg, German noblewoman (b. 1592)
 January 21 – Alban Roe, English Benedictine martyr (b. 1583)
 February 7 – William Bedell, English clergyman (b. 1571)
 February 19 – Jørgen Knudsen Urne, Danish noble (b. 1598)
 March 30 – William Augustus, Duke of Brunswick-Harburg (b. 1564)
 April 30 – Dmitry Pozharsky, Russian prince (b. 1578)
 May 9 – Jacques Bonfrère, Flemish Jesuit priest and biblical scholar (b. 1573)
 May 24 – Polyxena von Lobkowicz, politically active Czech aristocrat (b. 1566) 
 June 14 – Saskia van Uylenburgh, wife of painter Rembrandt van Rijn (b. 1612)
 July 3 – Marie de' Medici, French queen consort and regent (b. 1573)
 July 4 – Erzsébet Thurzó, Hungarian noblewoman (b. 1621)
 July 5 – Festus Hommius, Dutch theologian (b. 1576)
 July 17 – William, Count of Nassau-Siegen, German count (b. 1592)
 July 25 – Crato, Count of Nassau-Saarbrücken (1640–1642) (b. 1621)
 July 30 – Franz von Hatzfeld, Prince-Bishop of Würzburg (b. 1596)
 August 18 – Guido Reni, Italian painter (b. 1575)
 September 3 – Countess Elisabeth of Nassau, regent of Sedan (b. 1577)
 September 8 – Herman de Neyt, Flemish painter (b. 1588)
 September 12 – Henri Coiffier de Ruzé, Marquis of Cinq-Mars, French conspirator (b. 1620)
 September 29 – René Goupil, French Jesuit missionary, first of the Canadian Martyrs (b. 1608)
 October 3 – Charles Howard, 2nd Earl of Nottingham, English noble (b. 1579)
 October 19 – Giovanni Doria, Spanish noble (b. 1573)
 October 23 – George Stewart, 9th Seigneur d'Aubigny, Scottish nobleman and military commander (b. 1618)
 October 24 – Robert Bertie, 1st Earl of Lindsey,  English Fen drainage adventurer and soldier (b. 1583)
 November 1 – Jean Nicolet, French explorer (b. 1598)
 November 7 – Henry Montagu, 1st Earl of Manchester, English politician (b. c. 1563)
 November 14 – Henry Wallop, English politician (b. 1568)
 November 24 – Walatta Petros, saint in the Ethiopian Orthodox Tewahedo Church (b. 1592)
 November 25 – Christian Günther I, Count of Schwarzburg-Sondershausen (1601–1642) (b. 1578)
 December 4 – Armand Jean du Plessis, Cardinal Richelieu, French statesman (b. 1585)
 December 6 – Charles Caesar, English politician and judge (b. 1590)
 December 23 – Louis de Dieu, Dutch theologian (b. 1590)
 December 27 – Herman op den Graeff, Dutch bishop (b. 1585)
date unknown – Catholicos Patriarch Eudemus I of Georgia

References